Blowinghouse is the name of two settlements in Cornwall, England, United Kingdom. ("Blowing house" is an old name for a smelting house.)

 Blowinghouse hamlet in north Cornwall is situated near to Trevellas, midway between St Agnes and Perranporth. .
 Blowinghouse in west Cornwall is a residential area situated on the western outskirts of Redruth.  .

References

Hamlets in Cornwall